Alejandro Morellón (born 1985) is a Spanish writer. He was born in Madrid, and raised in Palma de Mallorca. 

His books include: 
 La noche en que caemos (winner of the 2013 MonteLeón Foundation Award)
 El estado natural de las cosas (winner of the 2017 Gabriel García Márquez Hispano-American Short Story Prize)
 Caballo sea la noche

In 2021, Morellon was named by Granta magazine as one of the best young writers in the Spanish language. 

He lives in Madrid.

References

Spanish writers
1985 births
Living people